The 1944 Virginia Cavaliers football team represented the University of Virginia during the 1944 college football season. The Cavaliers were led by eighth-year head coach Frank Murray and played their home games at Scott Stadium in Charlottesville, Virginia. They competed as independents, finishing with a record of 6–1–2.

Schedule

References

Virginia
Virginia Cavaliers football seasons
Virginia Cavaliers football